Ieva Gaile (born 26 January 1997) and her twin sister Kristine Gaile are Latvian figure skaters. She was born in Jelgava, Latvia, where she started her skating career at the age of 4. After two years she changed her coaches and started training in Ventspils, Latvia. She mainly skates in the ladies singles category, but in 2012 she and her twin sister were part of Latvian Synchronized skating team "Amber" and they participated in the World Synchronized Skating Championship 2012 (WSSC). In 2015 she changed coaches, and now is training in Jelgava Latvia, JLSS.

Program

Competitive highlights

References

Latvian female single skaters
Sportspeople from Jelgava
1997 births
Living people
Twin sportspeople
Latvian twins